Kampong Pandan is a residential area in Kuala Belait, the principal town of Belait District, Brunei. It has a population of around 16,200 in 2016. It encompasses a housing estate of the country's National Housing Scheme.

Name 
Kampong Pandan comes from the same name in Malay which translates as 'Pandan Village'. It is probably named after pandan, a tropical plant known for its aromatic leaves.

Geography 
Kampong Pandan is surrounded by the South China Sea to the north, Panaga to the east, Mumong to the south and Kuala Belait proper to the west.

Administration 
For census and other administrative purposes, Kampong Pandan has been divided into three villages:

Each village is assigned a village head. All of the administrative villages of Kampong Pandan are under Mukim Kuala Belait, a mukim subdivision of Belait District. The villages are also part of the municipal area of Kuala Belait.

Infrastructures

Schools 
Kampong Pandan is home to two of Kuala Belait's government primary schools, namely Pengiran Setia Jaya Pengiran Abdul Momin Primary School and Paduka Seri Begawan Sultan Omar Ali Saifuddien Primary School.

Kampong Pandan is also home to two of the town's government secondary schools, namely Pengiran Jaya Negara Pengiran Haji Abu Bakar Secondary School and Sayyidina Ali Secondary School. Pengiran Jaya Negara Pengiran Haji Abu Bakar Secondary School also houses a counterpart of Paduka Seri Begawan Sultan Science College, the country's secondary school which specialises in science and mathematics. Meanwhile, Sayyidina Ali Secondary School formerly housed the district's sole sixth form college; the latter now has a dedicated building located in the adjacent neighbourhood Mumong.

Each of Pengiran Setia Jaya Pengiran Abdul Momin Primary School, Pengiran Jaya Negara Pengiran Haji Abu Bakar Secondary School and Sayyidina Ali Secondary School also house an  school, the school for the country's Islamic religious primary education.

One of the two post-secondary vocational schools in Kuala Belait, Kemuda Institute, is also located in Kampong Pandan.

Miscellaneous 
Kampong Pandan encompasses the public housing estate RPN Kampong Pandan.

Kampong Pandan Mosque is the local mosque. It was opened in 1996 and can accommodate 1,100 worshippers.

Kampong Pandan Library is the local public library and operated by Dewan Bahasa dan Pustaka Brunei. It was inaugurated on 3 May 2006. The library houses a dedicated reading collection pertaining to Brunei Shell Petroleum, the country's primary oil and gas company.

Notes

References 

Belait District
Populated places in Brunei